Symplocos ecuadorica is a species of plant in the family Symplocaceae. It is endemic to Ecuador. Its natural habitat is subtropical or tropical moist montane forest.

References

Endemic flora of Ecuador
ecuadorica
Taxonomy articles created by Polbot